H.264 and VC-1 are popular video compression standards gaining use in the industry .

Overview

Terminology
All sources for the below information are from the respective specifications listed in the overview section.

Features

References

External links
 AVC/H264 Licensing costs and terms from MPEG LA
 EEtimes comparison of video codecs 
 
 Codec challenge comparison on Doom9 with professional VC1 encoder, PeP, and x264 for H264 => x264 win the first round
 Microsoft employee discusses differences between VC-1 and H.264
 Comparison at Doom9

MPEG-4
H.264 and VC-1
H.264 and VC-1
H.264 and VC-1
Video compression